Barry Rolfe Knight (born 18 February 1938) is a former English cricketer, who played in twenty nine Tests for England from 1961 to 1969.

Cricket correspondent Colin Bateman remarked, "a flamboyant cricketer... [Knight] was an elegant middle-order batsman and a bowler with a sharp turn of speed who never appeared to run out of energy".

Life and career
Born 18 February 1938, Chesterfield, Derbyshire, Knight was a fast bowling all-rounder, doing the cricketer's double (1,000 runs and 100 wickets in a season) four times, including the fastest in modern times, (two and a half months). He won the World Single Wicket Title at Lord's in 1964.

Knight made his county cricket debut with Essex in May 1955, leaving them at the end of the 1966 season for financial reasons to join Leicestershire. He emigrated to Australia at the end of the 1969 season, ending his career whilst still an England cricketer. He took 100 wickets in four seasons, and scored a thousand runs five times. He accomplished the double in each season from 1962 to 1965. In 1959, he missed the honour by a mere five runs. He made his highest first-class score, 165, against Middlesex at Brentwood in 1962.

His longest run at Test match level was the first six Tests he played in India and Pakistan in 1961–62. He was recalled nine times in a stop-start type of international career, but toured Australia twice in the 1962–63 and 1965-66 Ashes series, where he was a support bowler and lower order batsman. His 240 run, sixth wicket partnership, with Peter Parfitt against New Zealand in 1963, stood for almost forty years, until Graham Thorpe and Andrew Flintoff put the same opposition to the sword, with their partnership of 281 in Christchurch in March 2002.

He was the first professional coach in Australia, starting in 1970 at an indoor facility in Sydney. He was also the first coach to use video analysis, which led to his coaching over the past forty years of over twenty Test players, including Allan Border, Steve and Mark Waugh, Brett and Shane Lee, Adam Gilchrist, John Dyson, Andrew Hilditch and many New South Wales players and is coaching some upcoming players. He has coached over 20,000 young cricketers since 1970, and is still involved in school holiday programmes, and with Mosman Cricket Club in Sydney. He holds an ACB level 3 coaching certificate, and also a Marylebone Cricket Club (MCC) coaching certificate.

References

1938 births
Living people
Commonwealth XI cricketers
Essex cricketers
English cricketers
England Test cricketers
English cricket coaches
Leicestershire cricketers
International Cavaliers cricketers
English emigrants to Australia
Marylebone Cricket Club cricketers
Players cricketers
Combined Services cricketers
North v South cricketers
T. N. Pearce's XI cricketers
Marylebone Cricket Club Australian Touring Team cricketers